Jennie Spencer-Churchill  (9 January 1854 – 29 June 1921), known as Lady Randolph Churchill, was an American-born British socialite, the wife of Lord Randolph Churchill, and the mother of British prime minister Sir Winston Churchill.

Early life
Jennie Jerome was born in the Cobble Hill section of Brooklyn in 1854, the second of four daughters (one died in childhood) of financier, sportsman, and speculator Leonard Jerome and his wife Clarissa (always called Clara), daughter of Ambrose Hall, a landowner. Jerome's father was of Huguenot extraction, his forebears having emigrated to America from the Isle of Wight in 1710. Hall family lore insists that Jennie had Iroquois ancestry through her maternal grandmother; however, there is no research or evidence to corroborate this.

She was raised in Brooklyn, Paris, and New York City. She had two surviving sisters, Clarita (1851–1935) and Leonie (1859–1943). Another sister, Camille (1855–1863) died when Jennie was nine.

There is some disagreement regarding the time and place of her birth. A plaque at 426 Henry St. gives her year of birth as 1850, not 1854. However, on 9 January 1854, the Jeromes lived nearby at number 8 Amity Street (since renumbered as 197). It is believed that the Jeromes were temporarily staying at the Henry Street address, which was owned by Leonard's brother Addison, and that Jennie was born there during a snowstorm.

She was a noted beauty; an admirer, Lord d'Abernon, said that there was "more of the panther than of the woman in her look."

Personal life
Jennie was a talented amateur pianist, having been tutored as a girl by Stephen Heller, a friend of Chopin. Heller believed that his young pupil was good enough to attain "concert standard" with the necessary "hard work", of which, according to author Mary S. Lovell, he was not confident she was capable.

In 1909, when American impresario Charles Frohman became sole manager of The Globe Theatre, the first production was His Borrowed Plumes, written by Jennie. Although Mrs Patrick Campbell produced and took the lead role in the play, it was a commercial failure. It was at this point that Campbell began an affair with Jennie’s then husband, George Cornwallis-West.

Jennie served as the chair of the hospital committee for the American Women's War Relief Fund starting in 1914. This organization helped fund and staff two hospitals during World War I.

First marriage

Jennie Jerome was married for the first time on 15 April 1874, aged 20, at the British Embassy in Paris, to Lord Randolph Churchill, the third son of John Winston Spencer-Churchill, 7th Duke of Marlborough and Lady Frances Anne Vane. The couple had met at a sailing regatta on the Isle of Wight in August 1873, having been introduced by the Prince of Wales, the future King Edward VII. 

Although they became engaged within three days of this initial meeting, the marriage was delayed for months while their parents argued over settlements. By this marriage, she was properly known as Lady Randolph Churchill and would have been addressed in conversation as Lady Randolph.

The Churchills had two sons: Winston (1874–1965), the future prime minister, was born less than eight months after the marriage. According to his biographer William Manchester, Winston was most likely conceived before the marriage, rather than born prematurely. A recent biography has stated that he was born two months prematurely after Lady Randolph "had a fall." When asked about the circumstances of his birth, Winston Churchill replied: "Although present on the occasion, I have no clear recollection of the events leading up to it." Lady Randolph's sisters believed that the biological father of the second son, John (1880–1947) was Evelyn Boscawen, 7th Viscount Falmouth,<ref>Anne Sebba, American Jennie: The Remarkable Life of Lady Randolph Churchill", Norton, 2008</ref> although that was mostly discredited due to the boys' striking likeness to Randolph Churchill and to each other.

Lady Randolph is believed to have had numerous lovers during her marriage, including the Prince of Wales, Milan I of Serbia, Prince Karl Kinsky, and Herbert von Bismarck.

As was the custom of the day in her social class, Lady Randolph played a limited role in her sons' upbringing, relying largely upon nannies, especially Elizabeth Everest. Winston worshipped his mother, writing her numerous letters during his time at school and begging her to visit him, which she rarely did. He wrote about her in My Early Life: "She shone for me like the evening star. I loved her dearly – but at a distance." After he became an adult, they became good friends and strong allies, to the point where Winston regarded her almost as a political mentor, more a big sister than a mother.

Lady Randolph was well-respected and influential in the highest British social and political circles. She was said to be intelligent, witty, and quick to laughter. It was said that Queen Alexandra especially enjoyed her company, although Lady Randolph had been involved in an affair with her husband the king which was well known to Alexandra. Through her family contacts and her extramarital romantic relationships, Lady Randolph greatly helped her husband's early career, as well as that of her son Winston.

Later marriages
Lord Randolph died in 1895, aged 45. His death freed Jennie to move on effortlessly despite her lack of money; she mixed in the highest London society circles. Attending a party hosted by Daisy Warwick, Jennie was introduced to George Cornwallis-West, a captain in the Scots Guards who was just 16 days older than her own son Winston; he was instantly smitten, and they spent much time together. George and Jennie were married on 28 July 1900 at St Paul's Church, Knightsbridge.

Around this time, Jennie became well known for chartering the hospital ship  to care for those wounded in the Second Boer War, for which she was awarded the decoration of the Royal Red Cross (RRC) in the South Africa Honours list published on 26 June 1902. She received the decoration in person from King Edward VII on 2 October that year, during a visit to Balmoral Castle. 

In 1908, she wrote her memoirs, The Reminiscences of Lady Randolph Churchill. 

George doted on Jennie, amorously nicknaming her "pussycat". However, they drifted apart. The Churchills were becoming a dedicated literary family, and George, who was a financial failure in the City, slowly fell out of love with his wife, who was old enough to be his mother. Short of money, Jennie contemplated selling the family home in Hertfordshire to move into the Ritz Hotel in Piccadilly. George was in fragile health, and recuperated at the royal skiing resort of St Moritz. Jennie took to writing plays for the West End, in many of which the star was Mrs. Patrick Campbell.

Jennie separated from George in 1912, and they were divorced in April 1914, whereupon Cornwallis-West married Mrs. Campbell. Jennie dropped the surname Cornwallis-West, and resumed, by deed poll, the name Lady Randolph Churchill.Her third marriage, on 1 June 1918, was to Montagu Phippen Porch (1877–1964), a member of the British Civil Service in Nigeria, who was younger than her son Winston by three years. At the end of World War I, Porch resigned from the colonial service. After Jennie's death, he returned to West Africa, where his business investments had proven successful.

Death

In May 1921, while Montagu Porch was away in Africa, Jennie slipped while coming down a friend's staircase wearing new high-heeled shoes, breaking her ankle. Gangrene set in, and her left leg was amputated above the knee on 10 June.  At age 67, she died at her home at 8 Westbourne Street in London on 29 June, following a haemorrhage of an artery in her thigh resulting from the amputation.

She was buried in the Churchill family plot at St Martin's Church, Bladon, Oxfordshire, next to her first husband.

Cocktail misattribution
The invention of the Manhattan cocktail is sometimes erroneously attributed to Jennie Churchill, who supposedly asked a bartender to make a special drink to celebrate the election of Samuel J. Tilden to the New York governorship in 1874. However, though the drink is believed to have been invented by the Manhattan Club (an association of New York Democrats) on that occasion, Jennie could not have been involved as she was in Europe at the time, about to give birth to her son Winston later that month.

Portrayals

 Jennie Churchill was portrayed by Anne Bancroft in the film Young Winston (1972) and by Lee Remick in the British television series Jennie: Lady Randolph Churchill (1974).

See also
 The Anglo-Saxon Review, a quarterly miscellany edited by Lady Randolph Churchill

Notes

References

Further reading
 Churchill, Lady Randolph Spencer. The Reminiscences of Lady Randolph Churchill, 1908 (Autobiography)
 
 Leslie, Anita. Jennie: The Life of Lady Randolph Churchill, 1969
 Martin, Ralph G. Jennie: The Life of Lady Randolph Churchill – The Romantic Years, 1854–1895 (Prentice-Hall, Ninth printing, 1969)
 Martin, Ralph G. Jennie: The Life of Lady Randolph Churchill – Volume II, The Dramatic Years, 1895–1921 (Prentice-Hall, 1971) 
 Martin, Ralph G.  Reissue of both volumes of Jennie: The Life of Lady Randolph Churchill, (Sourcebooks, 2007) 
 Sebba, Anne. American Jennie: The Remarkable Life of Lady Randolph Churchill'' (W.W. Norton, 2007)

External links

 Interview with Anne Sebba, author of American Jennie

1854 births
1921 deaths
Socialites from London
Mistresses of Edward VII
Randolph Churchill, Lady
Winston Churchill
Women of the Victorian era
American autobiographers
American socialites
English autobiographers
British people of American descent
People from Cobble Hill, Brooklyn
Theatre people from London
Companions of the Order of the Crown of India
Dames of Grace of the Order of St John
British amputees
Burials at St Martin's Church, Bladon
Women autobiographers
20th-century British women writers
20th-century American women writers
American emigrants to England
Naturalised citizens of the United Kingdom
Parents of prime ministers of the United Kingdom
American women non-fiction writers
Members of the Royal Red Cross
American people of French descent